Asgar (born 19 June 1955) has been a celebrity hair stylist since 1981 and regular columnist in the weekly national British newspaper Eastern Eye ("Hair Care with Asgar") since 2005.
Asgar has done the hairstyling for covers and fashion features in Harper's Bazaar, Vogue, Tatler,  The Observer, The Times, The Independent, The Guardian, The Daily Telegraph, Daily Mail, Asiana Magazine, Good Housekeeping, Asian Women, and Asian Groom and Man.

Asgar has done work for TV, cinema, and fashion shows. Some of the celebrities Asgar has styled include:
Madeleine Albright
Joan Collins
Cindy Crawford
Ben Cross (Chariots of Fire)
Karisma Kapoor
Shah Rukh Khan 
Nicole Kidman
Akshay Kumar
Deepika Padukone
Gwyneth Paltrow
Aishwarya Rai
Rekha
Hrithik Roshan
Twiggy

According to the newspaper, Eastern Eye, Asgar also styles the "Asian Rich List," including the Madhvhani family, the Jatania family, Lord Noon, and Lady Paul.

References 

1955 births
Living people
British hairdressers